

Cook Island Nature Reserve is a protected area in the Australian state of new South Wales located on Cook Island about  off the coastline from the headland of Fingal Head and about  south-east of Tweed Heads on the state's north coast.

The nature reserve consists of the full extent of Cook Island down to the Mean High Water Mark. The land under protection was first proclaimed as a fauna reserve under the Fauna Protection Act 1948  on 8 August 1959. It became a nature reserve under the National Parks and Wildlife Act 1967 in 1967. It is surrounded by the Cook Island Aquatic Reserve.

In 1978, the nature reserve was described as follows:Cook Island provides a breeding habitat for seabirds, in particular the crested tern (Sterna bergii) and the wedge tailed shearwater (Puffinus pacificus). The crested tern is an international migratory bird.

The island is well vegetated with closed scrub. This vegetation provides shelter for the nesting birds. The island has a large population of wedge tailed shearwaters. Due to difficulty of access on to the island the vegetation has maintained its natural condition…

The nature reserve is classified as an IUCN Category Ia protected area.  In 1978, it was listed on the now-defunct Register of the National Estate.

See also
Protected areas of New South Wales
Nature reserve (Australia)

References

External links
Official webpage
Webpage on the Protected Planet website

Nature reserves in New South Wales
Protected areas established in 1959
1959 establishments in Australia
New South Wales places listed on the defunct Register of the National Estate